Humphrey William Maghull Yates (25 March 1883 – 21 August 1956) was an English first-class cricketer. Yates was a right-handed batsman who bowled right-arm medium pace.

Yates first appearance in County Cricket came in a single match in the 1907 Minor Counties Championship where he made an appearance for the Lancashire Second XI against Durham.

Yates made his first-class debut for Hampshire in the 1910 County Championship against Worcestershire. From 1910 to 1913 Yates played thirteen matches for Hampshire, with his final first-class appearance coming in the 1913 County Championship. During his time with the county Yates scored 242 runs at an average of 15.12, with a single half century score of 65*.

Additionally, in 1910 Yates made a first-class appearance for the Army and Navy against an Oxford and Cambridge Universities side. In 1911 Yates represented the Army and Navy in the same fixture, scoring 70 runs in the Army and Navy first innings.

In 1912 Yates made his debut for the Army against the Royal Navy. Yates made an additional two first-class appearances for the Army before the First World War, with his final pre-war first-class match coming for the Army against the Royal Navy.

Yates fought in the First World War, obtaining the rank of Major.

After the war Yates played a final first-class match for the Army against the Royal Navy at Lord's in 1920. It was during this match that Yates made his highest first-class score, making 97 in the Armies first innings.

Some point after this Yates moved to South Africa, where he continued to play club cricket into his sixties. Yates also acted as a scorer to the Transvaal Cricket Union and acted in this capacity for all Test matches and other important matches in Johannesburg from 1945 to 1956

Yates died in Abbotsford, Johannesburg, Transvaal on 21 August 1956.

Family
Yates' cousin James Yates represented the Europeans (India) in four first-class matches from 1911 to 1915, as well as representing Berkshire in the Minor Counties Championship in 1900. Yates father Joseph Yates represented Cambridge University in a single first-class match in 1866.

References

External links 
 
 Humphrey Yates at CricketArchive

1883 births
1956 deaths
People from Eccles, Greater Manchester
Cricketers from Salford
English cricketers
Hampshire cricketers
British Army cricketers
Army and Navy cricketers
British Army personnel of World War I
British Army officers
Military personnel from Lancashire
British emigrants to South Africa